This article lists events that occurred during 1932 in Estonia.

Incumbents

Events
Economic Depression in Estonia.
4 January – Soviet–Estonian Non-Aggression Pact was signed.
Estonian Encyclopedia was started to be published (until 1937).

Births
24 June – Heli Lääts, singer (d. 2018)

Deaths

References

 
1930s in Estonia
Estonia
Estonia
Years of the 20th century in Estonia